Hege Nerland (27 October 1966 – 12 March 2007) was a Norwegian politician for the Socialist Left Party.

In 2003 she helped found the local party chapter in her native Hemsedal. She worked with organic farming there, and had organizational experience from the Norwegian Farmers and Smallholders Union and Via Campesina. She was elected to the municipality council the same year, and became deputy mayor of Hemsedal. Following the 2005 Norwegian parliamentary election, she served as a deputy representative to the Norwegian Parliament from Buskerud. In November 2006, however, she had to relinquish her political positions due to illness. She died four months later.

References

1966 births
2007 deaths
Deputy members of the Storting
Socialist Left Party (Norway) politicians
Buskerud politicians
Women members of the Storting
20th-century Norwegian women politicians
20th-century Norwegian politicians
Organic farmers
People from Hemsedal